The Red-Light Sting is a 1984 American crime thriller television film directed by Rod Holcomb and written by Howard Berk, based on true events detailed in the February 2, 1981 New York magazine article "The Whorehouse Sting" by Henry Post. It stars Farrah Fawcett, Beau Bridges, and Harold Gould. It aired on CBS on April 5, 1984.

Plot
In order to arrest an elusive San Francisco crime boss, agents of the Justice Department come up with a plan to buy a brothel, install hidden cameras, and catch him in a sting operation when he inevitably extorts it for protection money. The rookie agent put in charge of the operation is aided by a veteran call girl at the brothel.

Cast
 Farrah Fawcett as Kathy Dunn
 Beau Bridges as Frank Powell 
 Harold Gould as Oliver Sully 
 Paul Burke as Brockelhurst 
 Alex Henteloff as Jesse Lorner 
 Conrad Janis as Bowman 
 Sunny Johnson as Sonia 
 James Luisi as Renny Lucas 
Philip Charles MacKenize as Ruger 
 Murray MacLeod as Ruger's assistant 
 Macon McCalman as Jeffers 
 Lawrence Pressman as Larry Barton

References

External links

1984 television films
1984 films
1984 crime films
1984 thriller films
1980s American films
1980s crime thriller films
1980s English-language films
American crime thriller films
American films based on actual events
American thriller television films
CBS network films
Crime television films
Films about extortion
Films about organized crime in the United States
Films about prostitution in the United States
Films based on newspaper and magazine articles
Films directed by Rod Holcomb
Films set in San Francisco
Organized crime films based on actual events
Television films based on actual events
Thriller films based on actual events